Anna Sapozhnikova (born 26 July 1997) is a Russian Paralympic athlete. She represented Russian Paralympic Committee athletes at the 2020 Summer Paralympics.

Career
Sapozhnikova represented Russian Paralympic Committee athletes at the 2020 Summer Paralympics in the women's long jump T37 event and won a bronze medal.

References

Living people
1997 births
Sportspeople from Chelyabinsk
Athletes (track and field) at the 2020 Summer Paralympics
Medalists at the 2020 Summer Paralympics
Paralympic medalists in athletics (track and field)
Paralympic bronze medalists for the Russian Paralympic Committee athletes
Russian female long jumpers